Chryseobacterium artocarpi  is a Gram-negative and non-spore-forming bacteria from the genus Chryseobacterium which has been isolated from rhizosphere soil from the tree Artocarpus integer. Chryseobacterium artocarpi produces flexirubin.

References

Further reading 
 
 
 

artocarpi
Bacteria described in 2014